Retiform purpura are lesions demonstrating an angulated or branched configuration. Retiform purpura is caused by blood vessel wall damage or occlusion of the vessel lumen resulting in complete vessel obstruction and skin ischaemia resulting in downstream cutaneous ischemia, purpura, and necrosis.

References 

Skin conditions resulting from physical factors